Ryongdam station is a railway station in Ryongdam-rodongjagu, Ch'ŏnnae county, Kangwŏn province, North Korea, on the Kangwŏn Line of the Korean State Railway; it is also the starting point of the Ch'ŏnnae Line to Ch'ŏnnae.

History
The station, originally called Munch'ŏn station (not to be confused with the current station of the same name, which was originally called Munp'yŏng station), along with the rest of the Okp'yŏng−Kowŏn−Kŭmya section of the former Hamgyeong Line, was opened by the Chosen Government Railway on 21 July 1916.

References

Railway stations in North Korea